Vasili Nikolayevich Aleynikov (born 15 May 1995) is a Russian football player. He plays for FC SKA-Khabarovsk.

Club career
He made his debut in the Russian Professional Football League for FC Pskov-747 on 20 July 2015 in a game against FC Solyaris Moscow.

He made his Russian Football National League debut for FC Tom Tomsk on 4 March 2018 in a game against FC Shinnik Yaroslavl.

References

External links
 
 

1995 births
Sportspeople from Perm, Russia
Living people
Russian footballers
Association football midfielders
FC Amkar Perm players
FC Tom Tomsk players
FC Shinnik Yaroslavl players
FC Chayka Peschanokopskoye players
FC Urozhay Krasnodar players
FC SKA-Khabarovsk players
Russian First League players
Russian Second League players